The Diary of Lady M is a 1993 Swiss drama film directed by Alain Tanner. The film was selected as the Swiss entry for the Best Foreign Language Film at the 66th Academy Awards, but was not accepted as a nominee.

Cast
  as M
 Juanjo Puigcorbé as Diego
 Félicité Wouassi as Nuria

See also
 List of submissions to the 66th Academy Awards for Best Foreign Language Film
 List of Swiss submissions for the Academy Award for Best Foreign Language Film

References

External links
 

1993 films
1993 drama films
Swiss drama films
1990s French-language films
Films directed by Alain Tanner
French-language Swiss films